Carlos Jesús García Guerrero (born October 15, 1967) is a Venezuelan former professional baseball second baseman and right-handed batter who played for the Pittsburgh Pirates (1990–96), Toronto Blue Jays (1997), Anaheim Angels (1998) and San Diego Padres (1999). He is a former Manager of the Pirates' Double-A affiliate, the Altoona Curve. In 2018, he became manager of the Acereros de Monclova of the Mexican League.

Playing career
García signed as an amateur free agent with the Pirates in 1987.  He spent nearly three seasons at the Pirates' AAA Buffalo farm team. García had his best season yet at Buffalo in 1992, batting .303, with 13 home runs and 70 runs batted in. Originally a shortstop the Pirates' trade of José Lind offered García an opportunity at second base, as Jay Bell was entrenched at shortstop.  He enjoyed his best seasons in 1995–96 batting .294 and .285.

In a 610-game career, García hit for .266 (580–2178), with 33 homers, 197 RBI, 274 runs scored, 102 doubles, 17 triples and 73 stolen bases.

He was the Pirates lone representative at the 1994 All Star game; he singled in his only at bat.

In 1996, García was traded with Orlando Merced and Dan Plesac to the Toronto Blue Jays for José Silva, two minor leaguers, and players to be named later, who included Abraham Núñez and Craig Wilson. García finished his career with single seasons with the Blue Jays, Anaheim Angels and San Diego Padres.

Coaching career
García served as the first base and third base coaches for the Seattle Mariners from 2005 through 2007. He served as the first base coach and infield instructor for the Pittsburgh Pirates for the 2010 season.

Carlos was named the manager of the Bradenton Marauders, the Class High-A affiliate of the Pittsburgh Pirates, in December 2010. In 2013, he was promoted as manager of the Pirates' Double-A affiliate the Altoona Curve. It was announced on Sep 23, 2014 that he would be fired from his position with the Altoona Curve.

García was announced as the hitting coach for the Acereros de Monclova of the Mexican League for the Spring Tournament of the 2018 season. He was promoted to manager for the Fall Tournament of the 2018 season, but left the organization prematurely for personal reasons.

See also
List of Major League Baseball players from Venezuela

References

External links

1967 births
Living people
Altoona Curve managers
Anaheim Angels players
Bradenton Marauders managers
Major League Baseball first base coaches
Major League Baseball players from Venezuela
Major League Baseball second basemen
Major League Baseball third base coaches
Mexican League baseball managers
National League All-Stars
Navegantes del Magallanes players
People from San Cristóbal, Táchira
Pittsburgh Pirates coaches
Pittsburgh Pirates players
San Diego Padres players
Seattle Mariners coaches
Toronto Blue Jays players
Venezuela national baseball team people
Venezuelan baseball coaches
Venezuelan expatriate baseball players in Canada
Venezuelan expatriate baseball players in the United States
Augusta Pirates players
Buffalo Bisons (minor league) players
Calgary Cannons players
Columbus Clippers players
Harrisburg Senators players
Las Vegas Stars (baseball) players
Macon Pirates players
Salem Buccaneers players
Vancouver Canadians players